Aaj Mood Ishqholic Hai is a hip hop single by Indian actress Sonakshi Sinha and Meet Bros Anjjan. The song is written by Kumaar and composed by Meet Bros Anjjan. It was released on 23 December 2015 under T-Series.

Background
"Aaj Mood Ishqholic Hai" is a song by Sonakshi Sinha and Meet Bros Anjjan. It is the debut of Sinha as a singer. The song is composed by Meet Bros Anjjan and the lyrics is written by Kumaar. Sinha said in an interview: "I told Bhushan Kumar of T-Series about this song, he was very encouraging. Meet Brothers (musicians), lyricist Kumaar and me, we all sat together and came up with this beautiful song". The song was released on 23 December 2015 with the on YouTube, iTunes and Hungama.com.

Music video
Music video was also released on 23 December 2015 under T-Series. It was shot in Goa, India and was choreographed by Salman Yusuff Khan. The music video has over 50 million views on YouTube. The song has been praised by Vishal Dadlani, Priyanka Chopra and Salim Merchant.

See also
Meet Bros Discography

References

External links
 Aaj Mood Ishqholic Hai on Hungama.com.

Hip hop songs
Hindi-language songs
T-Series (company) singles
2015 songs